Hughes River may refer to:

 Hughes River (Virginia)
 Hughes River (West Virginia)

See also 
 Hughes (disambiguation)